Bolbitius is a genus of small mushrooms in the family Bolbitiaceae.

Description

The genus Bolbitius is defined as small thin Mycena-like mushrooms, with a hymenoderm pileipellis, a glutinous cap surface, and spores that are brown in deposit.  Spores of mushrooms of this genus are thick-walled, smooth and have a germ pore.

Species
, Index Fungorum lists 54 valid species in Bolbitius:

Bolbitius acer
Bolbitius affinis
Bolbitius albiceps
Bolbitius albus
Bolbitius alliaceus
Bolbitius ameghinoi
Bolbitius broadwayi
Bolbitius bruchii
Bolbitius brunneus
Bolbitius caducus
Bolbitius callistus
Bolbitius citrinus
Bolbitius compactus
Bolbitius coprophilus
Bolbitius cremeus
Bolbitius demangei
Bolbitius elegans
Bolbitius excoriatus
Bolbitius exiguus
Bolbitius expansus
Bolbitius ferrugineus
Bolbitius flavellus
Bolbitius flavus
Bolbitius floridanus
Bolbitius grandiusculus
Bolbitius incarnatus
Bolbitius intermedius
Bolbitius jalapensis
Bolbitius lacteus
Bolbitius lineatus
Bolbitius longipes
Bolbitius luteus
Bolbitius malesianus
Bolbitius marginatipes
Bolbitius mesosporus
Bolbitius mexicanus
Bolbitius muscicola
Bolbitius panaeoloides
Bolbitius perpusillus
Bolbitius phascoides
Bolbitius pluteoides
Bolbitius pseudobulbillosus
Bolbitius psittacinus
Bolbitius reticulatus
Bolbitius roseipes
Bolbitius stramineus
Bolbitius subvolvatus
Bolbitius titubans
Bolbitius tjibodensis
Bolbitius tripolitanus
Bolbitius tucumanensis
Bolbitius versicolor
Bolbitius viscosus
Bolbitius yunnanensis

References

Bolbitiaceae
Agaricales genera